Mercedes Carreras (born 22 September 1940) is an Argentine actress. She has appeared in thirty films and television shows since 1957. She won the award for Best Actress for her role in Crazy Women at the 10th Moscow International Film Festival.

Filmography
 Aquellos años locos (1971)
 Había una vez un circo (1972) as Aurelia
 Los Padrinos (1973)
 Crazy Women (1977)
 Los Drogadictos (1979)

References

External links

1940 births
Living people
Argentine film actresses
Actresses from Buenos Aires